The Canadian Association for Physical Anthropology / L'Association Canadienne D'Anthropologie Physique (CAPA/ACAP) is a learned society of international scholars and students of Physical Anthropology in Canada. The Associations's mission is to promote and increase awareness and understanding of physical (biological) anthropology among its membership and to support institutions, agencies, and the public at large. The Association is guided by a constitution and code of ethics, holds annual meetings, distributes biannual newsletters to its membership, and offers funding opportunities for student members. The current president in 2017 is Dr. Ian Colquhoun (University of Western Ontario).

Mission Statement 
The mission statement of CAPA/ACAP, as listed on the website, is as follows: "The Canadian Association of Physical Anthropology / L'Association Canadienne D'Anthropologie Physique is a learned society of international scholars and students whose aim is to promote and increase awareness and understanding of physical (biological) anthropology among its membership, as well as to supporting institutions and agencies and the public at large. Physical anthropologists study adaptation, variability and evolution in a biocultural context. Our members recognize and celebrate the geographic and temporal diversity and complexity of ancient and modern humankind, our hominid forebears and our nonhuman primate cousins and their ancestors. As such, our discipline is inherently multidisciplinary, crossing the boundaries between the natural and social sciences, in order to provide a richer understanding of human diversity and complexity."

This statement is upheld by the CAPA-ACAP Constitution and Code of Ethics (2015).

Founding of the Association 
The Canadian Association for Physical Anthropology/L'Association Canadienne d'Anthropologie Physique (CAPA-ACAP) was founded during the 1972 meeting of the American Association of Physical Anthropologists. Founding members Drs. Frank Auger (Université de Montréal/Deceased), Charles Eyman (University of Calgary/Deceased), Geoff Gaherty (McMaster University), Jamshed Mavalwala (University of Toronto), James Paterson (University of Calgary), and Christopher Meiklejohn (University of Winnipeg) felt Canadian physical anthropologists should not have to travel to the United States to meet each other professionally. The first annual meeting was held in Banff in February 1973, where Drs. Frank Auger, Braxton Alfred, and Chris Meiklejohn were elected President, Secretary/Treasurer, and Newsletter Editor, respectively.

Executive Officer Positions 
CAPA-ACAP initially had three Executive Officer positions: President, Secretary-Treasurer, and Newsletter Editor. In 2003, the position of Student Representative was added to provide student members with a more active voice within the Association. With the launch of the first CAPA-ACAP website in 1997, the position of Webmaster was created. In 2014, the new CAPA-ACAP website was launched, along with a change in the title of Webmaster to Website Editor. More information regarding the roles and responsibilities of the Executive Officers, as well as a list of past Officers, is available on the CAPA-ACAP website

Publications 
The Association began a Newsletter in 1976 to keep the membership appraised of relevant events on a regular basis. In 1979, the Newsletter was transformed into a journal, the Canadian Review of Physical Anthropology, which published four volumes. In 1983, 1985, and 1986, topics typically covered in the Newsletter were incorporated into the Canadian Journal of Anthropology to reduce publication costs. Unfortunately, due to the cost involved in publishing a journal that had low circulation beyond the membership, the journal Canadian Review of Physical Anthropology was discontinued in 1985. Since then, the Association continues to publish a biannual Newsletter, including topics relevant for the membership, articles, minutes from the annual meeting, reports from the Executive Officers and so forth.

The Association has also published three other volumes. First, papers presented at an international symposium in honor of Davidson Black, the Canadian anatomist who named Sinanthropus pekinensis in 1927, were published in a volume titled "Homo Erectus: Papers in Honor of Davidson Black" edited by Sigmon and Cybulski (1981).  Second, CAPA-ACAP partially sponsored two symposia during the 1983 International Congress of Anthropological and Ethnological Sciences in Vancouver, which led to "Out of Asia: Peopling of the Americas and the Pacific" edited by Kirk and Szathmáry (1985). Finally, a symposium discussing the impact of opening of the Iron Curtain on academia during the 1991 CAPA-ACAP meeting in Hamilton resulted in the edited volume "Before the Wall Fell: The Science of Man in Socialist Europe" edited by Sigmon (1993).

Annual Meetings

CAPA-ACAP has held an annual meeting since its founding in 1973. A list of the location of the annual meetings and hosting institutions is provided below and more details are available on the CAPA-ACAP website.

References

External links
Official Site



Biological anthropology
Learned societies of Canada